The Laud Troy Book is an anonymous Middle English poem dealing with the background and events of the Trojan War. Dating from around 1400 and consisting of 18,664 lines of rhyming tetrameter couplets, the untitled poem has been given a name reflecting the former ownership, by Archbishop William Laud, of the unique manuscript (Oxford, Bodleian Library MS Laud Misc. 595) in which it is found.

Based on the prose Historia destructionis Troiae of Guido delle Colonne, the Laud Troy Book recasts the tale of the fall of Troy as a chivalric romance, with Hector as the principal heroic figure.

Bennett also notes that "the speeches are energetic and dramatic ... [t]he language is homely, the similes are unhackneyed". Helen Phillips attributes the energetic quality of the poem to the oral, minstrel-like style of the poet, calling it "literature very much conducted as speech, in narrative as much as in dialogue, a style which both conveys and naturalizes its ancient history for an English lay, non-scholarly audience".

Although it has been characterized as "quite untouched by any breath of true poesy" (by R. K. Root) and "rough, often deficient in grammar" (by Dorothy Kempe), it has also been called "the most interesting of the Troy romances".  offers the following judicious assessment of the poem:

Editions
 The Laud Troy Book: A Romance of About 1400 A.D., Now First Edited from the Unique MS. (Laud Misc. 595) in the Bodleian Library, Oxford, ed. J.Ernst Wülfing, Early English Text Society, Original Series 121, 122 (London: Kegan Paul, Trench, Trübner, 1902–03)

Modern English version 
 The "Laud Troy Book": The Forgotten Troy Romance, trans. D. M. Smith, The Troy Myth in Medieval Britain 3 (2019)

See also
 The Seege of Troye
 Troy Book

References

External links
 Online text of the Wülfing edition
 Synopsis of the plot at the University of York Database of Middle English Romance



Middle English poems
Romance (genre)
Trojan War literature
Works of unknown authorship